Chlorospatha is a genus of flowering plants in the family Araceae. Chlorospatha can be found from Costa Rica, Panama, Colombia, Ecuador, and Peru.

The plants are usually found in shaded bogs and are notoriously difficult to cultivate. One of the species, C. kressii is currently believed to be extinct.

Species
Chlorospatha amalfiensis Croat & L.P.Hannon - Antioquia region of Colombia
Chlorospatha antioquiensis Croat & L.P.Hannon - Antioquia region of Colombia
Chlorospatha atropurpurea (Madison) Madison - Ecuador
Chlorospatha besseae Madison - Ecuador
Chlorospatha betancurii Croat & L.P.Hannon - Antioquia region of Colombia
Chlorospatha bogneri Croat & L.P.Hannon - Ecuador, Colombia
Chlorospatha callejasii Croat & L.P.Hannon - Antioquia region of Colombia
Chlorospatha castula (Madison) Madison - Ecuador
Chlorospatha cogolloi Croat & L.P.Hannon - Antioquia region of Colombia
Chlorospatha corrugata Bogner & Madison - Antioquia region of Colombia
Chlorospatha croatiana Grayum - Costa Rica, Panama, Colombia
Chlorospatha cutucuensis Madison - Ecuador
Chlorospatha dodsonii (G.S.Bunting) Madison - Ecuador
Chlorospatha feuersteiniae (Croat & Bogner) Bogner & L.P.Hannon - Ecuador
Chlorospatha gentryi Grayum - Colombia
Chlorospatha hammeliana Grayum & Croat - Panama
Chlorospatha hastifolia Bogner & L.P.Hannon - Colombia
Chlorospatha ilensis Madison - Ecuador
Chlorospatha kolbii Engl. - Colombia
†Chlorospatha kressii Grayum - Chocó region of Colombia
Chlorospatha lehmannii (Engl.) Madison - Ecuador, Colombia
Chlorospatha longipoda (K.Krause) Madison - Ecuador
Chlorospatha luteynii Croat & L.P.Hannon - Antioquia region of Colombia
Chlorospatha macphersonii Croat & L.P.Hannon - Antioquia region of Colombia
Chlorospatha mirabilis (W.Bull) Madison - Panama, Colombia, Ecuador
Chlorospatha nicolsonii Croat & L.P.Hannon - Antioquia region of Colombia
Chlorospatha planadensis Croat & L.P.Hannon - Colombia
Chlorospatha ricaurtensis Croat & L.P.Hannon - Colombia

References

Aroideae
Araceae genera